Mungurwadi is a town in Gadhinglaj Taluka of Kolhapur district in Maharashtra, India. In 2001 it had a population of 3,271, but as of 2011, it has a population of 12,199. It is a major market place and the tenth largest settlement in Gadhinglaj taluka. Mungurwadi is about 24 km from Gadhinglaj, 29 km from second-largest settlement Kadgaon and 12 km from National Highway 48 (NH48).

Geography
It has an average elevation of 1,979  metres. It is a town, located near the border of Maharashtra and Karnataka. As the town lies on a hill, its climate is always cold with temperatures ranging from 27 °C to 19 °C in summer and 24 °C to 15 °C in winter. It is one of the most densely forested areas in Kolhapur.

History

The history of Mugruwadi dates back to 1500 AD. Its history is as old as Gadhinglaj, it was a small village in the Mountain. But in recent years it has seen a boom in economy, population and in real estate. It now has become an important town and market place in its area.

Demography

 India census,  Mugruwadi had a population of 3,271. But  India Census  Mugruwadi has a recent population is 12,199 which includes Mugruwadi town as well as extended areas included in the town. Its population grew four times in a decade and is one of the fastest-growing towns in Maharashtra. Males constitute 52% of the population and females 48%. Mugruwadi has an average literacy rate of 77%, higher than the national average of 74.9%: male literacy is 82%, and female literacy is 72%. In Mugruwadi, 15% of the population is under 6 years of age.
The languages most widely spoken is Marathi with 12,199 people speaking Marathi as their Primary Language. Hinduism is largest religion with 12,137 people following Hinduism followed by Muslim with 49 people and by Buddhist with 12 People.

Civic administration

The civic administration of this town is managed by Town council(Panchyat samiti).  It gets it revenue from various Ssctors for e.g. from tax collected from business, trading business, manufacturing, shops, rental spaces, property tax, etc. The Panchyat samiti overseas the engineering works, health, sanitation, water supply, administration and taxation in the town. Mugruwadi Panchyat samiti is headed by a town council president who is assisted by the town council chief officer and council members. The electrical supply to the Town is managed by the Maharashtra State Electricity Distribution Company Limited (MAHADISCOM). It has maintained a world class road and civic facilities thanks to its high revenue collected from various sectors.

Places of interest to tourists in and around Mugruwadi

Amboli, Sindhudurg
Jatobi Temple, Kadgaon (29 km away)
Prataprao Gurjar Smarak, Nesari
Kalbhairav Temple
Mahalaxmi Temmple
Ramling Temple, Virbhadra Temple, Laxmi Temple, Hanumaan Temple, and others around the town of Halkarni
Samangarh (The hill fort)
The Samangad grant, which belongs to the seventh Rasrakuta king Dantidurga or Dantivarma II, bears date sak 675 (A.D. 733–54)
River Hiranyakeshi
Kasturba garden
Tilak garden
Rajarshi Shahu garden
Shendri lake
Nakshatra Garden
Chitri Dam (near Ajra)
Laxmi Temple, Basarge
Kalavati Devi Temple (Hari mandir), Chidambarnagar
Shri Chaloba Temple, Kadal 3 km 
Kadal lake

Transportation

Mugruwadi is connected to all major cities and towns of Maharashtra and rest of India it connected to numerous state highways and is about 15 km from National Highway 4 (NH 4).

Nearest major airports

Vasco da Gama, Goa : Dabolim Airport 154 km
Belgaum : 42 km
Kolhapur : 92 km

Nearest railway stations

Belgaum towards south, Ghataprabha towards east, Kolhapur towards north and Savantwadi towards west.

Other distances from Mahagaon

Sankeshwar (NH 4)              :  20 km
Kolhapur                       :  92 km via Kalbhairi, 79 km via Sankeshwar
Belgaum                        :  42 km via Kowad, 69 km via Sankeshwar
Gadhinglaj                     :  24 km
Kadgaon                        :  29 km
Mahagaon                       :  10 km
Nesari                         :   9 km
Daddi                          :
10 km
Gokak Falls                    :  58 km
Ramtirth waterfalls near Ajara :  29 km
Amboli Hillstation             :  62 km
Savantwadi                     :  87 km
Panjim via Amboli Ghat         : 142 km
Tilari Ghat                    :  59 km
Panjim via Tilari Ghat         : 132 km
Goa                            :

References

Cities and towns in Kolhapur district
Talukas in Maharashtra